Dongchengyi Road is a station on the Pujiang line of the Shanghai Metro. It began passenger trial operations with the rest of the Pujiang line on March 31, 2018.

History 
This station opened for passenger operations on March 31, 2018, concurrent with the opening of the rest of the Pujiang line.

Description 
The station is located at the intersection of Sanlu Highway and Dongchengyi Road, in the Minhang District of Shanghai. The station structure is elevated, with its platforms located one level above the street. The platform level consists of two side platforms. There are two separate concourses, which each allow access to one side platform only. In order to travel between the platforms, passengers must exit the fare-paid area, descend to street level, cross the street, and re-ascend on the other side. Washrooms are available at street level, outside the fare-paid area, on the east side of the street. Like all stations on the Pujiang line, the station is fully accessible. The concourse and platform level is connected by two elevators, one on each side of Sanlu Highway.

Exits 
 Exit 2: Dongchengyi Road, Sanlu Highway east side (access to -bound platform only)
 Exit 1: Dongchengyi Road, Sanlu Highway west side (access to -bound platform only)

References 

Railway stations in Shanghai
Shanghai Metro stations in Minhang District
Railway stations in China opened in 2018
Pujiang line